AFL London is one of the largest organised Australian rules football leagues outside Australia. The league organises multiple grades of full 18-a-side games across London, United Kingdom.

The competition provides a competitive and fun game of football to the many Australians that live and work in London, as well as spreading the game to residents of non-AFL playing nations resident in the capital city including British, Irish, South African, American, Canadian, Italian and other Europeans.

The league is currently made up of eight clubs, across three levels of competition (Premiership, Conference and Social) that participate in a competition running from April to August.

History 
First formed in 1989, AFL London was formerly known as the British Australian Rules Football League (BARFL). The inaugural season was held in 1990 and featured eight teams; the London Hawks, West London Wildcats, North London Lions, Earls Court Kangaroos, Lea Valley Saints, Thames Valley Magpies, Wandsworth Demons and the Leicester-based East Midland Eagles. Of these eight foundation teams, West London, North London, Wimbledon (formerly the London Hawks) and Wandsworth continue to compete in the league.

In 2001 AFL London was expanded to incorporate two levels of competition, known as the Premiership and Conference competitions.  In addition, due to growing interest and numbers, a Social grade competition was added in 2007.

2008 saw an organisational restructure of Australian Rules Football in the UK, with the BARFL redeveloped to become AFL Britain. This change came about as a way of focusing the efforts of the organisation on supporting the growth of the game both in and outside the capital. It was at this time that the London competition was rebranded as AFL London.

In 2015 a women's competition  was introduced, including three of the foundation teams; Wandsworth Demons, North London Lions and Wimbledon Hawks, and the Peckham-based South East London Giants. This was expanded in 2017 into two divisions of four women's teams, with the addition of teams from the West London Wildcats, London Swans, Putney Magpies, and a second side from Wandsworth.

Teams 

Sussex Swans began in 1991 , London Swans emerged from a split

Premiership Winners 
The following teams have won the competition:

Pre-divisional structure 

 1990 Wandsworth 10.10 (70) d. Earls Court 9.14 (68)
 1991 Earls Court 18.15 (123) d. Wandsworth 12.15 (87)
 1992 Wandsworth 12.5 (77) d. West London 11.9 (75)
 1993 London Hawks 12.13 (85) d. Lea Valley 6.5 (41)
 1994 London Hawks 15.8 (98) d. West London 8.11 (59)
 1995 Wandsworth d. West London
 1996 Wimbledon d. West London
 1997 Wandsworth 7.11 (53) d. Wimbledon 7.10 (52)
 1998 Wimbledon 11.8 (74) d. Wandsworth 7.2 (44)
 1999 Wandsworth 14.10 (94) d. West London 14.5 (89)
 2000 West London 11.12 (78) d. Wandsworth 5.2 (32)

Divisional structure

Best and Fairest 
The Best & Fairest awards in each division celebrate outstanding players each season, as voted on by umpires at the conclusion of each game.

See also
AFL Europe
AFL England
Australian Rules Football in England

References

Australian rules football in London